Aganocrossus amoenus, is a species of dung beetle found in Afro-tropical regional countries.

Adult beetle has brown yellowish elytra with juxtasutural interstice. The sub-trapezoidal spot is found on both second and third interstices. Lateral sides are brownish black.

References 

Scarabaeidae
Insects of Sri Lanka
Insects described in 1857